The Liwale blind-snake (Afrotyphlops tanganicanus) is a species of snake in the family Typhlopidae. It is endemic to southeastern Tanzania.

References

Afrotyphlops
Snakes of Africa
Reptiles of Tanzania
Endemic fauna of Tanzania
Reptiles described in 1964
Taxa named by Raymond Laurent